Boavista Sport Club, commonly known as Boavista, is a Brazilian professional football club in  Saquarema, Rio de Janeiro. The team compete in Campeonato Carioca, the top tier of the Rio de Janeiro state football league. The club was formerly known as Esporte Clube Barreira.

History

Barreira
On October 14, 1961, the club was founded as Esporte Clube Barreira.

In 1991, EC Barreira won the Campeonato Carioca Terceira Divisão (Campeonato Carioca Third Division), after beating Bayer of Belford Roxo city. Both clubs were promoted to the following year's Segunda Divisão (Second Division).

In 1992, the club finished as the Segunda Divisão's runner-up, only behind Bayer, and was not promoted to the first division.

In 1995, the club played in the Campeonato Carioca's top level for the first time in history. The club finished in the 6th position of its group, so, Barreira failed to qualify to the second phase, but also avoided the relegation tournament. In the first phase's first stage the club finished in the 6th position, and in the second stage the club finished in the 7th position.

In 1996, the club again played in the Campeonato Carioca. Barreira finished in the 10th position in Taça Guanabara (which is the competition's first stage), and in the 11th position in Taça Rio (the competition's second stage).

In 1997, Barreira finished 12th in Taça Guanabara (last place), so the club was relegated and did not play in Taça Rio.

Boavista
On March 10, 2004, a group of businessmen assumed the club's control, and renamed the club to its current name, Boavista Sport Club. The club's logo was also changed. However, the colors remained the same.

In 2006, the club won its first title as Boavista, the Campeonato Carioca Segunda Divisão, being promoted to the following year's first division. In the final, the club beat Macaé Esporte. In the first leg, on June 25, 2006, Boavista won 2–1, at Estádio Cláudio Moacyr Azevedo, Macaé city. On July 2, 2006, at Estádio Eucy de Resende Mendonça, Boavista and Macaé drew 0–0.

Achievements

Regional
 Campeonato Carioca Série A2:
 Winners: 2006
 Campeonato Carioca Série B1:
 Winners: 1991
 Copa Rio:
 Winners: 2017

Kit manufacturer and shirt sponsors

Current squad

Out on loan

First-team staff

Stadium
The club's home matches are usually played at Estádio Elcyr Resende de Mendonça, which has a maximum capacity of 10,000 people.

Club colors
The club's colors are green, and white.

Mascot
Boavista's mascot is a firefly.

References

External links
Boavista Sport Club official website
Boavista at Arquivo de Clubes
Club info as Barreira

 
Association football clubs established in 1961
Football clubs in Rio de Janeiro (state)
1961 establishments in Brazil